Palaiyapatti Vadakkusethi is a village in the Thanjavur taluk of Thanjavur district, Tamil Nadu, India.

Demographics 

As per the 2001 census, Palaiyapatti Vadakkusethi had a total population of 2184 with 1129 males and 1055 females. The sex ratio was 934. The literacy rate was 37.15.

References 

 

Villages in Thanjavur district